Óscar Alberto García Fernández (born 16 May 1990) is a Honduran professional footballer who plays as a midfielder for Motagua in the Liga Nacional de Fútbol Profesional de Honduras.

He signed with Motagua in January 2021.

References

External links
 
 

1990 births
Living people
Association football forwards
Honduran footballers
C.D. Olimpia players
Deportes Savio players
C.D. Real de Minas players
F.C. Motagua players
Sportspeople from Tegucigalpa
Liga Nacional de Fútbol Profesional de Honduras players